Diamond Jubilee Challenge Cup is a rowing event for women's junior quadruple sculls at the annual Henley Royal Regatta on the River Thames at Henley-on-Thames in England.

The event is open to crews from any one club or school where no sculler will have attained her 18th birthday before the first day of September preceding the event. It was inaugurated in 2012.

Winners

References

Events at Henley Royal Regatta
Rowing trophies and awards